Krishnan Nair Shantakumari Chithra, often credited as K. S. Chithra or simply Chithra, is an Indian playback singer and carnatic musician from Kerala. Chithra also sings Indian classical, devotional, and popular music.

Chithra is a recipient of six National Film Awards, eight Filmfare Awards South and 36 different state film awards. She has won film awards from all the four south Indian states. She was awarded India's third highest civilian honor Padma Bhushan in 2021 and Padma Shri in 2005 for her valuable contributions towards the Indian musical fraternity. She was honoured by Sultan bin Muhammad Al-Qasimi, sovereign ruler of the Emirate of Sharjah and a member of the Federal Supreme Council of the United Arab Emirates in 2019, for successfully completing 40 years in Indian film industry. She was honoured with Rashtrapati Award for being the First Lady in the field of music felicitated by the Ministry of Women and Child Development of Government of India at the Rashtrapati Bhavan on 20 January 2018.

She is conferred with the highest honour of Rotary International, For the Sake of Honour Award in 2001 and has received the MTV Video Music Award – International Viewer's Choice at the Metropolitan Opera House, New York in 2001. She received honorary doctorates from Sathyabama University in 2011 and from The International Tamil University, United States in 2018. She is the only South Indian female singer who has presented her maiden concert at the world's prestigious concert hall Royal Albert Hall in London in 2001. Her song "Kannalane/Kehna Hi Kya" from the film Bombay (1995) was included in The Guardian "1000 Songs Everyone Must Hear Before You Die" list.

International honours
 2005 - Honoured by the British Parliament at the House of Commons in United Kingdom - (First Indian woman to achieve this feat)
 2001 - FOR THE SAKE OF HONOUR AWARD - Rotary International 
 2001 - MTV Video Music Award – International Viewer's Choice at Metropolitan Opera House, New York, United States (only singer from South India to achieve this feet)
 2004 - Vocational Excellence Award - Rotary International
 2009 - Honoured by the Government of China at Qinghai International Festival - (only Indian to achieve this feat)
 2018 - Honoured by Stephen M. Sweeney, President of New Jersey Senate and Craig Coughlin, the Speaker of New Jersey General Assembly, United States
 2019 - Honoured by Sultan bin Muhammad Al-Qasimi, sovereign ruler of the Emirate of Sharjah and is a member of the Federal Supreme Council of the United Arab Emirates, UAE for successfully completing 40 Years in Indian Film Industry

National honours
 2021 – Padma Bhushan  – India's third highest civilian honour
 2005 – Padma Shri – India's fourth highest civilian honour
 2001 - National Excellence Award 2001 by Limca Book of Records
 2018 - Rashtrapati Award for being the "First Ladies" in the field of music felicitated by the Ministry of Women and Child Development of Government of India  at the Rashtrapati Bhavan on 20 January 2018.

State government honours
 1997 – Kalaimamani Award – Government of Tamil Nadu
 2011 – Bharath Ratna Lata Mangeshkar Award – Government of Andhra Pradesh for Cultural Council
 2013 - Sangeeta Samman Puraskar (P B Srinivas) Award by the Government of Karnataka
 2014 – Kerala Samsthana Vanitha Rathnam (Kamala Surayya Award) by Government of Kerala for Social Welfare Department
 2018 - Harivarasanam Award by the Government of Kerala

Indian honorifics
 2011 – Honorary Doctorate – Sathyabama University, Chennai, Tamil Nadu
 2018 – Honorary Doctorate – The International Tamil University United States
 Kalaimamani
 Kalaiselvam
 Gana priya
 Kala Ratna
 Kala srestha
 Sangeetha Ratnam
 Swara Ratna
 Sathkeerthi
 Sangeetha Ganendhuchooda
 Vanitha Ratnam
 Stree Ratna

Lifetime achievement awards
 2003 – Lifetime Achievement Award from Global Malayali council London
 2003 – Swaralaya Yesudas Award Lifetime Achievement Award
 2005 – SIKHARAM – 15 lifetime achievement award 2005 from India Today
 2005 – Jeevan TV – P. Jayachandran Lifetime Achievement Award 2005
 2007 – Aginhotri lifetime achievement award 2007 from Samorin of Calicut
 2014 - Lifetime Achievement Award from Raindropss a youth-based social organization on the occasion of Women's Day
 2017 –  V.C.Padmanabhan memorial award for lifetime achievement from manappuram finance Ltd.
 2018 - Legend of the Year Award - RED FM MUSIC AWARDS 2018
 2019 -  Women achievers, News7 Tamil's Thangatharagai Lifetime Achievement award for being as an inspiring women icon and for her outstanding achievements
 2019 - Most Socially Committed Lifetime Achievement Award - Ishal Laila Awards 2019, Dubai
 2019 - "Excellence in the field of Music Award" - JFW Women Achievers 
 2021 - "Mirchi Music's Lifetime Achievement Award" for extraordinary contribution to South-Indian Film Music

National Film Awards

Chithra has won six National Awards for best female playback singer, the highest by any female playback singer.
 1986 – Best Female Playback Singer – "Padariyen Padippariyen, Naan Oru Sindhu" (Sindhu Bhairavi, Tamil)
 1987 – Best Female Playback Singer – "Manjal Prasadavum" (Nakhakshathangal, Malayalam)
 1989 – Best Female Playback Singer – "Indupushpam Choodi Nilkum Raathri" (Vaishali, Malayalam)
 1996 – Best Female Playback Singer – "Maana Madurai" (Minsaara Kanavu, Tamil)
 1997 – Best Female Playback Singer – "Payalein Chun Mun" (Virasat, Hindi)
 2004 – Best Female Playback Singer – "Ovvoru Pookalume" (Autograph, Tamil)

Filmfare Awards
 1998: Nominated—Best Female Playback Singer - "Payaley Chunmun" (Virasat)
 2004: Nominated— Best Female Playback Singer - "Koi Milgaya" (Koi... Mil Gaya)

Filmfare Awards South
She is a singer with 18 Filmfare Awards South Nominations, resulting in 9 wins for 3 different languages.
She holds the record of winning Filmfare Awards South for record number of times in Malayalam & Telugu i.e.,5 & 3 times respectively. She has a record for being the oldest winning singer at 53 years of age for the Telugu song- 'Ee Premaki' & also the oldest nominated female singer ever at the age of 59, for the Tamil song 'Yennuyire'.
 2004: Best Female Playback Singer – Telugu – "Nuvvostanante" (Varsham)
 2006: Best Female Playback Singer – Malayalam – "Kalabham Tharam" (Vadakkumnadhan)
 2006: Best Female Playback Singer – Kannada – "Araluva Hoovugale" (My Autograph)
 2008: Best Female Playback Singer – Malayalam – "Oduvil Oru" (Thirakkatha)
 2009: Best Female Playback Singer – Malayalam – "Kunnathe Konnakyum" (Pazhassiraja)
 2013: Best Female Playback Singer – Telugu – "Seethammavaakitlo" (Seethamma Vakitlo Sirimalle Chettu)
 2016: Best Female Playback Singer – Telugu  – "Ee Premaki" (Nenu Sailaja)
 2017: Best Female Playback Singer - Malayalam - "Nadavathil" (Kambhoji)
 2022: Best Female Playback Singer - Malayalam - "Theerame" (Malik)

Nominations
 2005: Nominated— Best Female Playback Singer – Telugu - "Manasa Manasa" (Nireekshana)
 2006: Nominated— Best Female Playback Singer – Telugu - "Muvvala Navvakala" (Pournami)
 2006: Nominated— Best Female Playback Singer – Telugu - "Manasavacha" (Godavari)
 2009: Nominated—Best Female Playback Singer - Kannada - "Nadheem Dheem Tana" (Gaalipata)
 2011: Nominated—Best Female Playback Singer - Malayalam - "Malakha Pole" (Mummy & Me)
 2013: Nominated—Best Female Playback Singer - Malayalam - "Vishukkili Kanippoo Kondu Vaa" (Ivan Megharoopan)
 2015: Nominated—Best Female Playback Singer – Telugu - "Marhaba" (Malli Malli Idi Rani Roju) (shared the nomination with Aishwarya)
 2016: Nominated—Best Female Playback Singer - Tamil - "Konji Pesida Venaam" (Sethupathi)
 2021: Nominated—Best Female Playback Singer - Tamil - "Yennuyire" (Annathae)

IIFA Utsavam
 Nominations
 2017: IIFA Utsavam for Best Female Singer - "Maye Maye" (Jessie)

Kerala State Film Awards
Chithra is the highest recipient of Kerala State Awards under the "Best Playback Singer Female" category & she has won it for 16 times with a record of winning them for 11 times in a row i.e.,(1985-1995)
 2016 – Best Play Back Singer – "Nadavathil Thurannilla" (Kambhoji)
 2005 – Best Play Back Singer – "Mayangipoyi" (Nottam)
 2002 – Best Play Back Singer – "Karmukil Varnante" (Nandanam)
 2001 – Best Play Back Singer – "Mooli Mooli" (Theerthadanam)
 1999 – Best Play Back Singer – "Pular Veyilum" (Angane Oru Avadhikkalathu)
 1995 – Best Play Back Singer – "Sasikala Charthiya" (Devaraagam)
 1994 – Best Play Back Singer – "Parvanenthu" (Parinayam)
 1993 – Best Play Back Singer – "Ponmeghame" (Sopanam), "Rajahamsame" (Chamayam), "Sangeethame" (Gazal)
 1992 – Best Play Back Singer – "Mounasarovaram" (Savidham)
 1991 – Best Play Back Singer – "Thaaram" (Keli), "Swarakanyakamar" (Santhwanam)
 1990 – Best Play Back Singer – "Kannil Nin Meyyil" (Innale),  "Palappoove" (Njan Gandharvan)
 1989 – Best Play Back Singer – "Kalarivilakku" (Oru Vadakkan Veeragatha),  "Thankathoni" (Mazhavilkavadi)
 1988 – Best Play Back Singer – "Indupushpam" (Vaishali)
 1987 – Best Play Back Singer – "Eenam marannakatte" (Eenam Maranna Kattu), "Thalolam Paithal" (Ezhuthappurangal)
 1986 – Best Play Back Singer – "Manjalprasadavum" (Nakhakshathangal)
 1985 – Best Play Back Singer – "Oreswaram Ore Niram"  (Ente Kaanakkuyil), "Poomaname" (Nirakkoottu), "Aayiram Kannumai" (Nokkethadhoorathu Kannum Nattu)
 2006- Best Play Back Singer- Dhum Dhum Dooreyetho- Rakkilippattu , Enthu Paranjalum - Achuvinte Amma

Karnataka State Film Awards
 1997 – Best Female Playback Singer – "Hele Kogile Impagalaa" (Nammoora Mandara Hoove)
 2001 – Best Female Playback Singer – "Navileno Kunibeku" (Gattimela)
 2005 – Best Female Playback Singer – "Kandamma Kandamma" (Maharaja)

Zee Cine Awards
 2002 - Nominated—Zee Cine Award for Best Playback Singer - Female - "Raat Ka Nasha Abhi" - Asoka
 2004 - Nominated—Zee Cine Award for Best Playback Singer - Female - "Kasam Ki Kasam" - Main Prem Ki Diwani Hoon

Global Indian Music Academy Awards (GIMA)
 2013 – Best Carnatic Classical Album - Vocal - Album "Vande Vasudevam" an album based on Annamacharya Krithis.

MTV Video Music Award
 2001 – International Viewer's Choice Awards MTV India (Hindi pop category) Album Piya Basanti.(The first singer from South India to get the MTV Award)

Star Screen Awards
 1996 - Best Female Playback - "For various South Indian languages"
 1997 - Best Female Playback - "For various South Indian languages"
 1998 – Best Female Playback – "Payale Chummun" (Virasat)
 2002 - Nominated—Best Female Playback - "Pyaar Tune Kya Kiya" - Pyaar Tune Kya Kiya

MTV Immies Awards
 2003 - Best Play Back Singer - "Koi Mil Gaya" (Koi... Mil Gaya)

Producers Guild Film Awards
 2004 - Nominated—Producers Guild Film Award for Best Female Playback Singer - "Koi Mil Gaya" (Koi... Mil Gaya)

South Indian International Movie Awards
 2017 - Best play Back Singer Tamil - "Konji Pesida Venaam" (Sethupathi)
 2017 - Best Play Back Singer Malayalam - "Kaadaniyum Kalchilambe" (Pulimurugan)
 2018 - Best Play Back Singer Malayalam - "Nadaavathil" (Kamboji)
 2015 - Nominated— Best Female Playback Singer (Telugu) - "Gopikamma" (Mukunda)
 2014 - Best Female Playback Singer (Telugu) - ''Seethamma Vakitlo'' (Seethamma Vakitlo Sirimalle Chettu)
 2022 - Nominated— Best Female Playback Singer (Malayalam) - "Malik" (Theerame)

Gulf Malayalam Music Awards (GMMA)
 2005 - Best Female Playback Singer
 2006 - Best Female Playback Singer
 2008 - Best Female Playback Singer

Reporter TV Film Awards
 2022 – Best Female Playback Singer – "Theerame Theerame" Malik)

Kerala Film Critics Association Awards
1984 - Best Female Playback Singer – Nokkethadoorathu Kannumnattu
1985 - Best Female Playback Singer – Various films
1986 - Best Female Playback Singer – Shyama, Thalavattam, Nakhashathangal
1987 - Best Female Playback Singer – Idanazhiyil oru kaalocha, Manivathoorile ayiram shivarathrikal
1994 - Best Female Playback Singer – Various Films
 2016 – Best Female Playback Singer – "Ormakalil Oru Manjukaalam" "Mallanum Mathevanum"
 2020 - Best Female Playback Singer – "Perfume"

Asiavision Awards
 2013 – Best Female Playback - "Ilaveyil Viralukalayi" (Artist)
 2015 – Best Female Playback Tamil- "Malargal Kaettaen" (OK Kanmani) .
 2016 – Best Female Playback - "Kaadaniyum Kalchilambe..." (Pulimurugan) and "Poovithalai..." (Thoppil Joppan)

Mazhavil Mango Music Awards
 2017 – Best Duet Song - "Kaadaniyum Kalchilambe" (Pulimurugan) - Malayalam shared with K.J. Yesudas
 2018 – Best Playback Singer (Female) - "Mridhu Mandahasam" (Poomaram) - Malayalam

Other honours
 1994 – Ugadi Purashkar by Madras Telugu Academy, Chennai
 2002 – Title of "KALAISELVAM" From South Indian Film Artistes' Association or South Indian Nadigar Sangam
 2012 – "People of the Year" Honoured by Limca Book of Records
 2013 – Special Honour for contribution to Malayalam Film Industry 100 years Indian Cinema Celebration at Chennai.
 2014 – Lifetime Achievement Award from Raindropss a youth-based social organization on the occasion of Women's Day
 2014 – Felicitated by Limca Book of Records for "Empowering Women - Women Achievers of Kerala"
 2014 – Vayalar Award by Vayalar Ramavarma Memorial Foundation for contribution of Malayalam Music Industry
 2015 – Felicitated by The Supreme Head of Malankara Orthodox Syrian Church Baselios Mar Thoma Paulose II at "SOMRO"15
 2015 – Felicitated Thottuvaa "Dhanwanthari Puraskaram" by Justice Raman (Tranvancore Devaswom Ombudsman).
 2016 – Angamaly NRI Association (ANRIA) "Swararathna Puraskaram" as lifetime achievement award for her outstanding performance and creative contributions in the field of music spanning last 36 years.

Other awards
 Cinema Express Awards for 1986, 1987, 1988,1990,1991,1993,1994,1995,1998. She won it for 9 times
 Film Fans Association Chennai Award – 20 times (This is the oldest film award in South India)
 Gamma Indian Music Award, Malaysia for 1988,1989,1990,1996. Won it for 4 times
 2001 – "For the sake of honour" award from Rotary International
 2001 – Lux – Asianet Award for the best playback singer Kannada
 2004 – "Vocational excellence" award from Rotary International
 2005 – VIRTUSO Music Awards 2005
 2006 – Lux – Asianet Award for the best playback singer Kannada
 2008 – Devasthanam Award for GANAPRIYA Puraskaram by Peringottukara Devasthanam Temple Trust
 2012 – Thikkurissy Award for Best Female Playback Singer – "Naattuvazhiyorathe" (Khaddama)
 2013 – ETV Kannada Sangeet Samman (P. B. Sreenivas) Award
 2013 – CERA BIG Malayalam Music Awards for Best Female Playback - "Ilaveyil Viralukalayi" (Artist) and "Ponnodu Poovay" (Thalsamayam Oru Penkutty)
 2013 – CERA Big Malayalam Music Awards for Face of the Award - Honoured for completing three decades in the industry
 2014 – Minimol Memorial Charitable Trust - Sathkeerthi Puraskaram
 2014 – Mappila Kala Academy in memory of K Raghavan Master - Sangeetha Ratnam Puraskaram for her contribution to film industry
 2014 – K.P. Radhakrishna Menon memorial Kala Ratna Award for her outstanding contributions to music.
 2015 – K.P.S Menon Memorial Award 2015 by Chettoor Sankaran Nair Memorial Trust, Ottapalam.
 2015 – Harmony International Award 2015 instituted by Marthoma Research Academy, Azhikode, Kodungallur.

Other achievements
 She has also received numerous mainstream awards like MTV Immies, Screen – Videocon Award, Film Fans Association Awards, and Cinema Express Awards. Chithra was also awarded the 'Vocational Excellence' Award by the Rotary Club of Coimbatore.
 Her song "Kannalane (Kehna Hi Kya)" from the film Bombay (1995) was included in The Guardian's "1000 Songs Everyone Must Hear" list.

References

Lists of awards received by Indian musician